Windsor Bridge railway station served the suburb of Pendleton, historically in Lancashire, England, from 1838 to 1856 on the Manchester and Bolton Railway. On the 1848 OS map, Windsor Bridge is where The Crescent crosses the railway. Today, this is the site of Salford Crescent station.

History
The station was opened on 29 May 1838 by the Manchester and Bolton Railway. Its services were reduced to Wednesdays only in December 1842 and it closed in October 1846. It reopened in January 1855, only to permanently close in June 1856.

Accidents
An accident occurred on 16 October 1839 when an engineer fell off a train before it reached the station.

References

Disused railway stations in Greater Manchester
Railway stations in Great Britain opened in 1838
Railway stations in Great Britain closed in 1846
Railway stations in Great Britain opened in 1855
Railway stations in Great Britain closed in 1856
1838 establishments in England
1856 disestablishments in England